"That Girl" is a song by English indie rock band Noisettes from their third studio album, Contact (2012). It was released as the album's lead single in the United Kingdom as a digital download on 12 August 2012. The song peaked to number 87 on the UK Singles Chart.

Live performances
On 29 August 2012 they performed "That Girl" on BBC Breakfast. On 16 September 2012 they performed the song on The Andrew Marr Show.

Critical reception
Robert Copsey of Digital Spy gave the song a positive review stating:

Shingai Shoniwa sings about a blossoming romance over a peppy, toe-tapping melody that evokes the golden era of surf rockers The Beach Boys and The Honeys. Like a glass of Sex on the Beach, the result is instantly refreshing and guaranteed to loosen those hips. .

Track listing

Chart performance

Weekly charts

Release history

References

2012 singles
Noisettes songs
2012 songs